Anopina internacionana is a species of moth of the family Tortricidae. It is found in Durango, Mexico and Arizona and Colorado in the United States.

The wingspan is 13–15 mm.

References

Moths described in 2000
internacionana
Moths of North America